Jean-Marie Duthilleul (born 1952) is a French architect and civil engineer.

Education
He studied architecture at the École de Paris La Seine, Paris and engineering at the École Polytechnique and the École des Ponts et Chaussées (now ).

Career
In 1977, he became interested in the subject of urban planning, particularly of planned communities, which helped shape his views on centralisation, social mobility, population density and, later, energy management.

In 1982, he was project manager for the Universal Exposition and in 1983 was put in charge of the management of large Parisian civil state-sponsored projects. In 1986, the directors of SNCF (French State Railways) hired him to form a new architectural division. With Étienne Tricaud, he laid the theoretical groundwork for the creation of new, large stations in a contemporary style, which he saw from the points of view of both urban planning and architecture: opening up the city, intermodal transport, traffic management, accessibility and commercial development.

In 1997, he won the competition for the new high speed train station in Seoul, Korea. He and Tricaud created the multidisciplinary AREP agency ("Management, Research, Interchange") as a wholly owned subsidiary of SNCF. AREP has since been involved in the development of many stations and other urban developments both in France and elsewhere.

Duthilleul was a consultant on the Grand Paris project, working with Jean Nouvel and Michel Cantal-Dupart. From 2010 to 2012 he presided over the planning committee for Plan Campus set up by the French Ministry of Higher Education and Research.

In 2012, he created his own practice, Agence Duthilleul.

Projects 

 Gare de Paris-Montparnasse
 Gare de Nantes
 Management of the Gare de Paris-Nord, Paris
 New Gare de Lille-Europe
 New  Gare Aéroport Charles-de-Gaulle 2 TGV
 Gare de La Plaine-Stade de France RER station (Seine-Saint-Denis)
 New Gare de Marne-la-Vallée - Chessy (Disneyland Paris)
 Stations on the LGV Méditerranée (2001):
 Gare d'Avignon TGV
 Gare de Valence TGV
 Gare d'Aix-en-Provence TGV
 Saint-François de Molitor Church, Paris (2005)
 Capital Museum, Beijing (2005)
 Gares de la LGV Est européenne (2007):
 Gare de Champagne-Ardenne TGV, Bezannes
 Gare de Lorraine TGV, Louvigny
 Gare de Meuse TGV, Les Trois-Domaines
 Halle Honorat and management of the Gare de Marseille-Saint-Charles (2006)
 Gare de Strasbourg (redevelopment with canopy construction) (2007)
 Gare d'Orléans, Paris (2007)
 Bitexco Financial Tower, Ho Chi Minh City (2010)
 Wuhan Railway Station (2010)
 Gare de Belfort - Montbéliard TGV (2011)
 Gare de Besançon Franche-Comté TGV (2011)
 Planned for the Grand Paris Express:
 Stations at Pont de Sèvres (Paris RER) and Noisy - Champs (Paris RER) (2020)
 Stations at Sevran - Livry (Paris RER) and Sevran - Beaudottes (Paris RER) (2023)

Duthilleul also designed stations in Seoul, Korea and Shanghai, China. He has also worked on projects at several cathedrals including the Notre Dame de Paris and Notre Dame de Strasbourg.

References 

French civil engineers
Corps des ponts
20th-century French architects
21st-century French architects
École Polytechnique alumni
Members of the Académie d'architecture
French people in rail transport
Living people
1952 births
People from Versailles